Public humanities is the work of engaging diverse publics in reflecting on heritage, traditions, and history, and the relevance of the humanities to the current conditions of civic and cultural life. Public humanities is often practiced within federal, state, nonprofit and community-based cultural organizations that engage people in conversations, facilitate and present lectures, exhibitions, performances and other programs for the general public on topics such as history, philosophy, popular culture and the arts. Public Humanities also exists within universities, as a collaborative enterprise between communities and faculty, staff, and students.

Workers within the public humanities endeavor to create physical and virtual spaces where the public can engage in conversation, learning and reflection about issues and ideas. Public humanities projects include exhibitions and programming related to historic preservation, oral history, archives, material culture, public art, cultural heritage, and cultural policy. The National Endowment for the Humanities notes that public humanities projects it has supported in the past include "interpretation at historic sites, television and radio productions, museum exhibitions, podcasts, short videos, digital games, websites, mobile apps, and other digital media." Many practitioners of public humanities are invested in ensuring the accessibility and relevance of the humanities to the general public or community groups.

The American Council of Learned Societies' National Task Force on Scholarship and the Public Humanities suggests that the nature of public humanities work is to teach the public the findings of academic scholarship: it sees "scholarship and the public humanities not as two distinct spheres but as parts of a single process, the process of taking private insight, testing it, and turning it into public knowledge." Others, such as former museum director Nina Simon and Harvard professor Doris Sommer, suggest a more balanced understanding of the ways in which history, heritage, and culture are shared between the academy and the public. These approaches draw on the notion of shared historical authority.

Subfields of the public humanities include public history, public sociology, public folklore, public anthropology, public philosophy, historic preservation, museum studies, museum education, cultural heritage management, community archaeology, public art, and public science.

Public Humanities Scholarship 
Research and writing in public humanities comes both from the public sector (museum curators and educators, for example) and from faculty, staff, and students in universities.

A 2020 anthology, Doing Public Humanities (Routledge) works to define a scholarship of Public Humanities which is interdisciplinary and combines a practitioner's focus on case studies with the scholar's more abstract and theoretical approach. Edited by Susan Smulyan, a professor of American Studies at Brown University, this work builds on Smulyan's tenure as the director of the John Nicholas Brown Center for Public Humanities and Cultural Heritage at Brown University and features case studies written by other scholars affiliated with the center. The essays explore “the cultural landscape from disruptive events to websites, from tours to exhibits, from after school arts programs to archives," providing a broad perspective of the work of public humanities.

In another example of Public Humanities scholarship, Matthew Wickman, an English professor and founder of the Brigham Young University Humanities Center, constructed a survey to identify the future role of "public humanities." Wickman planned to identify on what "Public Humanities" means in order to address the methods that would account as Public Humanities. The survey was sent to humanities centers and institutes, bringing a wide range of answers, with some people replying "that organizing a public festival qualifies as public humanities." From the research, it's clear that there is ongoing discussion about the methods of "public humanities" with "seventy-five per cent of respondents reporting that engaging members of the community has either a moderate or major impact on their institution." Wickman addresses how the concept of "public humanities" is portrayed by asking: ‘‘What are the public humanities?’’ and suggesting we might pose a different question: ‘‘Where are they?’ Are they found in old-fashioned outreach, or in newer models of engagement? In research or teaching? Within universities or alongside them?" Wickman believed using data to formulate an answer to his question was very effective, hoping to help scholars in humanities to get the public relevance they want.

Programs in Public Humanities 
Several universities have established programs in the public humanities (or have otherwise expressed commitments to public humanities via the creation of centers, degrees, or certificate programs with investments in various forms of "public" work). Programs include:

Brown University, whose John Nicholas Brown Center for Public Humanities and Cultural Heritage supports public humanities programs and offers a stand-alone MA in Public Humanities, a Certificate in Public Humanities for PhD students, and a transitional MA in Public Humanities for PhD students in American Studies.
Michigan State University was hosting a Public Humanities Collaborative as of 2007.
New York University offers a Certificate in Public Humanities through their Public Humanities Initiative in Graduate Education.
Portland State University, whose Portland Center for Public Humanities provides a yearlong forum of talks, roundtables, and workshops.
Rutgers University–Newark, whose Public Humanities track in the American Studies MA program.
University of Arizona established the Department of Public & Applied Humanities in 2017. As of 2022, their BA has eight tracks: Business Administration; Fashion Studies; Game Studies; Medicine; Plant Studies; Public Health; Rural Leadership & Renewal; and Spatial Organization & Design Thinking.
University of Michigan - Ann Arbor offers the Rackham Program in Public Scholarship.
University of Sheffield, which offers an MA in Public Humanities with pathways in digital humanities, public engagement and cultural heritage.
University of Western Ontario has a program called The Public Humanities at Western.
University of Wisconsin–Madison has a public scholarship program, Public Humanities Exchange that supports collaborative work between humanities grad students and the community.
The Walter Chapin Simpson Center for the Humanities at the University of Washington offers a Certificate in Public Scholarship.
Yale University, whose MA program in Public Humanities is part of the American Studies Program at the Graduate School of Arts and Sciences.
Georgetown University offers a Graduate Certificate in the Engaged & Public Humanities.
University of Maryland, Baltimore County has a Minor in Public Humanities.
Oakland University in 2019 chartered a Center for Public Humanities.
The Institute for Women Surfers is a grassroots educational initiative in the Public Humanities that brings together women surfers, activists, artists, business owners, scientists and educators, to create spaces of peer teaching, learning, and mutual aid.
Carolina Public Humanities at the University of North Carolina at Chapel Hill offers extensive public outreach programs, a dedicated K12 teacher training subsidiary (Carolina K12), and a state-outreach program in partnership with the state's community colleges.

Public Humanities Organizations 
Humanities Councils: Each U.S. state and territory has a humanities council. Growing out of the National Endowment for the Humanities, humanities councils grant funds to local organizations for public humanities programs and create their own programs as well.

Cultural Agents, Pre-Texts: Developed by Harvard University professor Doris Sommer, Pre-Texts is a user-friendly pedagogy to achieve rigorous holistic education. The approach is simple: treat texts as prompts for making art.

Humanities Action Lab: "A coalition of universities, issue organizations, and public spaces that collaborate to produce community-curated public humanities projects on urgent social issues."

Imagining America: "The Imagining America consortium (IA) brings together scholars, artists, designers, humanists, and organizers to imagine, study, and enact a more just and liberatory ‘America’ and world. Working across institutional, disciplinary, and community divides, IA strengthens and promotes public scholarship, cultural organizing, and campus change that inspires collective imagination, knowledge-making, and civic action on pressing public issues."

National Humanities Alliance: "The National Humanities Alliance is a coalition of organizations dedicated to advancing humanities education, research, preservation, and public programs."

Northeast Public Humanities Consortium: Links eleven diverse campuses to build partnerships and enhance the relationship between liberal arts and the public through public humanities practices.

References 

Humanities
Humanities